The Field Apothecary is an herbal CSA in the Hudson Valley. There are other aspects to their business.

It is a CSA share apothecary, providing teas and herbs and so on to subscriber-customers, founded by Dana and Michael Eudy.

References

 http://www.registerstar.com/news/article_c7a0bbde-311a-11e2-a9ca-001a4bcf887a.html
 http://www.rhobserver.com/12832/a-field-of-dreams-coming-true/
 http://modernfarmer.com/2013/10/meet-modern-farmers-spring-2013/
 http://ediblehudsonvalley.com/editorial/summer-2013/valley-vitals-the-herbalisers/
 Buff, Sheila. Food Lovers' Guide To® The Hudson Valley: The Best Restaurants, Markets & Local Culinary Offerings. Globe Pequot, 2013. (recipe page 320, listing page 159)

Farms in New York (state)